Till Cissokho (born 8 February 2000) is a French professional footballer who plays as centre-back for Ligue 2 club Quevilly-Rouen.

Club career
On 11 January 2019, Cissokho signed his first professional contract with Bordeaux. He made his professional debut with Bordeaux in a 3–0 Ligue 1 loss to Saint-Étienne on 14 April 2019.

On 27 June 2022, Quevilly-Rouen confirmed that Cissokho will return to the club for the 2022–23 season on a permanent contract after playing on loan in the previous season.

International career 
Cissokho is a former youth international for France, representing his country from under-16 to under-18 level. He won the Tournoi du Val-de-Marne with the under-16 side in 2015.

Honours 
France U16

 Tournoi du Val-de-Marne: 2015

References

External links

2000 births
Living people
Footballers from Paris
Association football defenders
French footballers
France youth international footballers
French sportspeople of Senegalese descent
Championnat National 3 players
Championnat National 2 players
Ligue 1 players
Ligue 2 players
2. Liga (Austria) players
FC Girondins de Bordeaux players
Clermont Foot players
SC Austria Lustenau players
US Quevilly-Rouen Métropole players
French expatriate footballers
Expatriate footballers in Austria
French expatriate sportspeople in Austria